Mirlan Eshenov (born 14 March 1988 in USSR) is a Kyrgyzstani professional football manager.

Career
In 2007, he began his professional career for the FC Abdish-Ata Kant. Until 2012 he played for the FC Dinamo Bishkek.

In 2014, he started his coaching career in FC Abdish-Ata Kant. Since 12 June until 20 October 2014 he was a caretaker coach of the Kyrgyzstan national football team.

References

External links
 
 Profile at Soccerpunter.com
 

1988 births
Living people
Kyrgyzstani footballers
FC Abdysh-Ata Kant players
FC Dinamo Bishkek players
Kyrgyzstani football managers
FC Abdysh-Ata Kant managers
Kyrgyzstan national football team managers

Association footballers not categorized by position